The manga series Beelzebub was written and illustrated by Ryūhei Tamura. It was serialized in Shueisha's Weekly Shōnen Jump magazine from February 2009 to February 2014, and then under the title Beelzebub Another in the same publisher's Shōnen Jump Next!! from May 2014 to March 2015. The first volume was released by Shueisha in July 2009, and the twenty-eighth and final one in May 2015.

Beelzebub was adapted as an anime television series by Studio Pierrot and aired from January 9, 2011 to March 25, 2012 with a total of 60 episodes. It was simulcast by Crunchyroll.

Volume list

References

External links
Official Shueisha Beelzebub introduction 

Beelzebub